Urach may refer to:

Bad Urach, a town in Baden-Württemberg, Germany
Urach (Breg), a river of Baden-Württemberg, Germany, tributary of the Hammerbach
Duke of Urach, a title in the Kingdom of Württemberg
House of Urach, a morganatic cadet branch of the formerly royal House of Württemberg

Kuno von Urach (Cuno of Praeneste, died 1122),  German Cardinal and papal legate, diplomatic figure
Ludwig I, Count of Württemberg-Urach (1412–1450), Count of Württemberg
Ludwig II, Count of Württemberg-Urach (1439–1457), Count of Württemberg
Wilhelm, Duke of Urach (1810–1869), first Head of the House of Urach
Wilhelm Karl, Duke of Urach (1864–1928), German prince, King of Lithuania, with the regnal name of Mindaugas II
Princess Elisabeth of Urach (1894–1962), wife of Prince Karl Aloys of Liechtenstein
Wilhelm von Urach (1897–1957), member of the House of Württemberg, automotive production engineer
Karl Gero, Duke of Urach (1899–1981), head of the morganatic Urach branch of the House of Württemberg
Albrecht von Urach (1903–1969), German nobleman, artist and wartime author, journalist, linguist and diplomat
Karl Anselm, Duke of Urach (born 1955), former head of the morganatic Urach branch of the House of Württemberg
Wilhelm Albert, Duke of Urach (born 1957), head of the morganatic Urach branch of the House of Württemberg
Andressa Urach (born 1987), Brazilian model, businesswoman and reality television personality